The Regiment Infanterie Oranje Gelderland is a mechanized infantry regiment of the Royal Netherlands Army. Re-established in 2006 it forms the mechanized infantry battalion 45 Painfbat RIOG. It operates the newly acquired CV90 Infantry fighting vehicle.

Oranje Gelderland

Military units and formations established in 1722
Military units and formations established in 2006